Zane Clark Hodges (June 15, 1932 – November 23, 2008) was an American pastor, seminary professor, and Bible scholar.

Some of the views he is known for are these:
"Free Grace theology," a view that holds that eternal life is received as a free gift only through belief in Jesus Christ for eternal life and it need not necessarily result in repentance or good works. Therefore, one need not preach repentance when preaching the message of salvation.
"Eternal rewards," a view that various passages in the New Testament are not dealing with eternal salvation but addressing Christians and the opportunity to earn eternal rewards or to caution against their loss.
His position in support of the Majority Text.

Life 
Hodges was reared in Chambersburg, Pennsylvania, and came to Dallas, Texas in the fall of 1954 after receiving a bachelor's degree from Wheaton College. He received a master of theology degree from Dallas Theological Seminary in 1958. He then taught New Testament Greek and Exegesis (1959–1986) at Dallas Seminary and was chairman of the New Testament Department for some time.

Hodges also served as pastor at Victor Street Bible Chapel, formerly The Old Mission in Dallas, for almost 50 years. Recently he was active in the Oak Cliff Bible Fellowship and the Grace Evangelical Society. He was the founder and president of Kerugma Ministries.

Theology

Free Grace and the Lordship Salvation Controversy 
In the late 1980s, Hodges and John F. MacArthur presented differing views over the gospel through various books, generally known as the "Lordship salvation controversy". Hodges propagated the Free Grace position, which teaches that the free gift of eternal life is without cost to the believer, that it comes through simply believing in Jesus Christ and there is no need of any repentance or obedience to be followed. A distinction is recognized between believing (which results in receiving eternal life) and submission to the Lordship of Christ (which is part of the sanctification process). Free Grace Theology also teaches that once a person believes in Jesus Christ, they cannot lose their salvation. MacArthur argued instead for Lordship Salvation, claiming that salvation is by faith alone, and it would lead to repentance and results in good works, and that a true Christian would not continue sinning without remorse but would instead obey God's commands to do good works. MacArthur viewed biblical faith as always leading to surrender and obedience, while Hodges taught that biblical faith was the conviction that something is true.

Repentance 
Hodges rejected the view of repentance as a "change of mind", holding instead the view that it is a God-fearing decision to turn from sin: "Repentance is the decision to turn from sin to avoid, or bring to an end, God's temporal judgment" (Harmony with God, p. 57). Hodges stresses that repentance facilitates faith in Christ, but is not a condition for eternal salvation, nor is it part of faith itself. "It is one thing to say that repentance facilitates faith in Christ—the Bible teaches that. It is quite another thing to say that repentance is a requirement for eternal life. That the Bible does not teach" (Harmony with God, p. 93).

Initially in his book Absolutely Free! and later in more detail in his book Harmony with God Hodges took the position that the process of repentance may be a preparatory step in coming to salvation and should be evident in the life of a believer, but eternal life is received by believing in Jesus, not by turning from sin. Hodges points out that the gospel of John, which he claims is the only book of the Bible written to lead the unsaved to Christ, never uses the term "repentance."  In Harmony with God Hodges says there is only one answer to the question, "What must I do to be saved?" Hodges emphatically states, "[Paul's and Silas's] answer said absolutely nothing about repentance. Instead they gave the famous and simple reply 'Believe on the Lord Jesus Christ, and you will be saved' (Acts 16:31)."

Majority Text 
In 1982, Hodges published with Arthur L. Farstad an edition of The Greek New Testament According to the Majority Text with Apparatus. The Byzantine text-type, or Majority Text, is considered by its advocates to be a more accurate rendering of the Greek New Testament, though the more commonly accepted New Testament text, called the Alexandrian text-type, which is used in the Nestle-Aland (N/A) text and the United Bible Societies Greek Testament (UBS), is based on more ancient New Testament fragments. Hodges argues:

Works

Thesis

Books 

 

 - 2nd edition of the 1981 title.

Posthumous Books

Chapters

Journal articles 
 
 
 
 
 
 
"Post-Evangelicalism Confronts the Postmodern Age" (1996, Journal of the Grace Evangelical Society)
"Legalism: The Real Thing" (1996, Journal of the Grace Evangelical Society)
"Assurance: of the Essence of Saving Faith" (1997, Journal of the Grace Evangelical Society)
"Making Your Calling and Election Sure: An Exposition of 2 Peter 1:5-11" (1998, Journal of the Grace Evangelical Society)
"1 Thessalonians 5:1–11 and the Rapture" (2000, Chafer Theological Seminary Journal)
"How to Lead People to Christ, Part 1" (2000, Journal of the Grace Evangelical Society)
"How to Lead People to Christ, Part 2" (2001, Journal of the Grace Evangelical Society)
"Harmony with God, Part 1" (2002, Chafer Theological Seminary Journal)
"Harmony with God, Part 2" (2002, Chafer Theological Seminary Journal)
"Harmony with God, Part 3" (2003, Chafer Theological Seminary Journal)
"Regeneration: A New Covenant Blessing" (2005, Journal of the Grace Evangelical Society)
"Justification: A New Covenant Blessing" (2006, Journal of the Grace Evangelical Society)

References

External links
 James A. Borland: "Memorials", Journal of the Evangelical Theological Society 52 (2009), pp. 213f.
 Eunaka Kirby: "Zane C. Hodges: New Testament scholar, speaker, author", The Dallas Morning News, November 29, 2008. 
 "Zane Hodges", Wheaton History A to Z, Alumni.
Audio messages by Zane Hodges

American biblical scholars
Dallas Theological Seminary alumni
Wheaton College (Illinois) alumni
Dallas Theological Seminary faculty
New Testament scholars
People from Chambersburg, Pennsylvania
1932 births
2008 deaths